The White List is a list of countries assessed by the International Maritime Organization as properly implementing the STCW-95 convention.  As of 2006, the countries were:
 Algeria

 Antigua and Barbuda
 Argentina
 Australia
 Azerbaijan
 Bahamas
 Bahrain
 Bangladesh
 Barbados
 Belgium
 Belize
 Brazil
 Brunei Darussalam
 Bulgaria
 Cambodia
 Canada
 Cape Verde
 Chile
 China*
 Colombia
 Comoros
 Cote d'Ivoire
 Croatia
 Cuba
 Cyprus
 Czech Republic
 Democratic People's Republic of Korea
 Denmark**
 Dominica
 Ecuador
 Egypt
 Estonia
 Ethiopia
 Fiji
 Finland
 France
 Georgia
 Germany
 Ghana
 Greece
 Guyana
 Honduras
 Hungary
 Iceland
 India
 Indonesia
 IranIslamic Republic of
 Ireland
 Italy
 Israel
 Jamaica
 Japan
 Jordan
 Kiribati
 Kuwait
 Latvia
 Lebanon
 Liberia
 Lithuania
 Luxembourg
 Madagascar
 Malaysia
 Malawi
 Maldives
 Malta
 Marshall Islands
 Mauritius
 Mexico
 Micronesia (Federated States of)
 Morocco
 Mozambique
 Myanmar
 Netherlands***
 New Zealand****
 Nigeria
 Norway
 Panama
 Papua New Guinea
 Peru
 Philippines
 Poland
 Portugal
 Qatar
 Republic of Korea
 Romania
 Russian Federation
 Saint Vincent and the Grenadines
 Samoa
 Saudi Arabia
 Senegal
 Singapore
 Slovak Republic
 Slovenia
 Solomon Islands
 South Africa
 Spain
 Sri Lanka
 Sweden
 Switzerland
 Thailand
 Tonga
 Trinidad and Tobago
 Tunisia
 Turkey
 Tuvalu
 Ukraine
 United Arab Emirates
 United Kingdom*****
 United Republic of Tanzania
 Uruguay
 Vanuatu
 Venezuela
 Viet Nam
 Yugoslavia******

* Includes  Hong Kong, China (Associate Member of the IMO)
** Includes Faroe Islands (Associate Member of the IMO)
*** Includes  Netherlands Antilles & Aruba
**** Includes The Cook Islands
***** Includes Isle of Man, Bermuda, Cayman Islands, Gibraltar
****** As from 4 February 2003, the name of the State of the Federal Republic of Yugoslavia was changed to Serbia and Montenegro. Following
the dissolution of the State of Serbia and Montenegro on 3 June 2006, all treaty actions relating to the provisions of the STCW Convention
undertaken by Serbia and Montenegro continue to be in force with respect to the Republic of Serbia and the Republic of Montenegro with
effect from the same date, i.e. 3 June 2006.

External links
 IMO

White List